Patrick Harten is an American Air Traffic Controller who guided US Airways Flight 1549 to its successful ditching in the Hudson River.

Harten was controlling arrivals and departures at New York's LaGuardia Airport on the day of the accident and was the only controller to have contact with the aircraft during the emergency sequence. Despite offering the flight crew multiple runways at LaGuardia as well as options to land at Teterboro and Newark airports, Harten was also the first to know the Airbus A320 would ditch in the water. He did not learn that everyone had survived until an hour after the accident.

Harten spent years of his career prior to flight 1549 working in the New York area. He worked Newark traffic before being moved to LaGuardia departure.

Harten has openly discussed the mental anguish he experienced during and after the ordeal. He suffered from post-traumatic stress for months after the accident and sought therapy.

Harten has been an Air Traffic Controller since at least 2004. His father was an air traffic controller as well.

Personal life and education 
Harten is married and lives in Long Beach with his wife. He has three siblings.

Harten earned a degree in chemistry from Stony Brook University before training to become an Air Traffic Controller in Alaska.

Harten is an avid runner and triathlete who was completed the Boston Marathon, the New York City Marathon, and Ironman triathlons.

In 2016, Harten founded a brewing company to make a personalized craft beer.

Media
Harten was portrayed by Patch Darragh in the 2016 Clint Eastwood film Sully. Harten invited Darragh to observe an ATC shift before shooting the movie to help make Darragh's depiction more accurate.

References 

Living people
Year of birth missing (living people)